Robert Balzar  (born 11 May 1962) is a Czech jazz bassist and composer who was born in Náchod.

Robert Balzar studied bass at academy of music in Brno. After working with various groups, he founded Robert Balzar Trio in 1996. The collaboration with American jazz guitar player John Abercrombie brought him international attention.

He worked together with Joe Newman, Benny Bailey, Tony Scott, Benny Golson, Wynton Marsalis, Lew Tabackin, Sinan Alimanović, Tony Lakatos, Victor Lewis, the Hal Galper Trio, Craig Handy and others.

Awards 
Robert Balzar and his Trio received several awards:
 1998: Album Travelling, best Czech CD of the year during the Czech Radio Jazz Test
 1999: Robert Balzar, best Czech  bassist of the year
 2000: Album Alone, best Czech CD of the year
 2000: Robert Balzar Trio, best Czech group of the year

Discography of Robert Balzar Trio 
 1998: Travelling
 2000: Alone
 2005: Overnight
 2008: Tales, with John Abercrombie
 2010: Theyories, with vocalist Dan Bárta
 2013: Discover Who We Are
 2014: Vuja Dé

External links 
 Homepage of Robert Balzar
 Robert Balzar  on allaboutjazz.com

1962 births
Living people
Czech jazz double-bassists
Male double-bassists
21st-century double-bassists
21st-century Czech male musicians
Male jazz musicians